A hanging tree or hangman's tree is any tree used to perform executions by hanging, especially in the United States. The term is also used colloquially in all English-speaking countries to refer to any gallows.

Hanging trees in the United States by state
Arizona
 Greaterville Hanging Tree: Oak tree outside of the ghost town Greaterville, Arizona, where Pima County police officers lynched two Mexican men for alleged cattle rustling and other crimes in 1915. Located along a dirt road in the northern Santa Rita Mountains, near the historic Greaterville townsite.
 Vulture City Hanging Tree: Ironwood tree located in the ghost town of Vulture City, Arizona, next to the remains of Henry Wickenburg's stone cabin built circa 1863. Eighteen men were hanged from this tree in the late 19th century for "high grading" (stealing gold ore).

California
 Calabasas Hanging Tree: Oak tree once located next to a small jail building in Old Town Calabasas, California. Died in the 1960s and felled by a storm in 1995. A second tree that still stands in Calabasas is also rumored to have been used for hangings, though there is debate as to which tree was the real hanging tree.
 Hangman's Tree: Juniper tree in Holcomb Valley, California, where the legal executions of at least four condemned men were performed in the late 19th century.
 Hangman's Tree: Sycamore tree located on the Irvine Ranch in Orange County, California. In 1857 General Andres Pico hanged two bandits from this tree. A historical marker now commemorates the event.
 "Hangmans" Tree: Oak tree, now dead, in the ghost town of Second Garrotte, California. First settled in 1849, Second Garrotte is Spanish for "Second Hanging". As many as 60 people were hanged from this tree. The remaining tree stump is now preserved and is located on State Highway 120.
 Jackson Hanging Tree: Live oak tree that once stood at 26 Main in Jackson, California, before being cut down following 1862 Jackson fire. Ten men were lynched from this tree between 1851 and 1855. A historical marker now marks its original location.
 New Almaden Hanging Tree: Oak tree located at the New Almaden Mine site in San Jose, California.

Colorado

 The Hangin' Tree: Located in Montrose, Colorado, and used in the 1878 hanging of George Bikford, who was accused of robbery and horse theft. The tree, now dead, has been preserved and a historical marker has been placed at its location.
 Pueblo Hanging Tree: Formerly located on Union Avenue in Pueblo, Colorado. Felled June 25, 1883.

Georgia
 Savannah Hanging Tree: Live oak located in Colonial Park Cemetery in Savannah, Georgia.

Kansas
 Hangman's Tree: Located in the Boot Hill Cemetery in Dodge City, Kansas.

Massachusetts
 Gallows Hill: A large tree once located at Proctor's Ledge, near the base of Gallows Hill in Salem, Massachusetts, was probably the site of 19 executions in the 1692 Salem witch trials

Montana
 Hangman's Tree: Ponderosa pine tree once located in Helena, Montana. Ten men were lynched from this tree between 1865 and 1870 by the Helena Vigilantes. Felled by landowner, Methodist Minister W. M. Shippen, in 1875. Two pieces of the tree now reside in the collection of the Montana Historical Society in Helena.
 Jefferson County Hanging Tree: Ponderosa pine tree allegedly used for hangings in the territorial period of the state's history. Located near Clancy, in Jefferson County, Montana.

New Mexico
 Chloride Hanging Tree: Large oak tree in the ghost town of Chloride, New Mexico.

New York
 Hangman's Elm: English Elm located in Washington Square Park in Manhattan, New York.
 Patchogue Hanging Tree: Located along the Swan River on Grove Street in Patchogue, New York.

Oklahoma

 Creek Hanging Tree: A 200-year-old bur oak used for the hanging of cattle rustlers and Creek tribesmen. Located on Lawton Avenue in Tulsa, Oklahoma.

Oregon

 Dallas Hanging Tree: Oak tree used in the 1887 lynching of Oscar Kelty, who murdered his wife, and as recently as 1900 for legal hangings as Polk County, Oregon's official gallows. Located near the Polk County Courthouse in Dallas, Oregon.
 Lafayette Hanging Tree: First used in 1863 and finally in 1887, when convicted murderer Richard Marple was hanged in what became known as "The Lafayette Gypsy Curse" incident. Formerly located on private property in Lafayette, Oregon; cut down by property owners in the 1940s.
 Salem Hanging Tree: Located in Salem, Oregon.

South Carolina
 Charleston Hanging Tree: Located in Charleston, South Carolina, and reputed to be the site where Denmark Vesey and 34 of his followers were hanged in 1822.

South Dakota
 Hangman's Tree: Located on a ridge, formerly known as Hangman's Hill, in Dinosaur Park in Rapid City, South Dakota.

Texas
 Bandera Hanging Tree: Oak tree, also known as the "Tragedy Tree." Site of the July 25, 1863, hanging of seven of nine traveling German immigrants by Confederate soldiers on patrol from Camp Verde during the Civil War, for reasons unclear and still disputed.  Members of the patrol decided to execute the immigrants on pretense of fleeing military service, even though they had willingly surrendered and were accompanying the patrol back to base to sort out the nature of their travel.  Their remains were looted and left naked and un-buried, leading many to believe they had been murdered by the roving patrol for their belongings.  Some of the soldiers with the 25-strong contingent that apprehended the immigrants rode for base when they learned over night camp that their comrades planned to change plans and hang the captives, while the remaining soldiers and commanding officer were seen the next day passing back through Bandera wearing the immigrants' clothing and leading their horses.  $900 known to have been carried by one of the immigrants for the purchase of livestock was never found, along with a teenage boy who had accompanied them.  Located on the Hanging Tree Ranch south of Bandera, Texas.
 Brazoria Hanging Tree: Located in Brazoria, Texas. Known as the Masonic Oak for the formation of the first Texas Masonic Lodge by early Texans (including Anson Jones, future third Republic of Texas President) who met under its branches in 1834, it is preserved and located in a park of the same name. Urban legend has it that from this same tree "two slaves were unjustly hanged" and their ghosts now haunt the area, causing horses to freeze under the tree and cars to stall. However, no details, evidence, or source material to confirm this internet claim can be found. The Brazoria area, which contains low moss-laden oaks, dense marshy woods and much wildlife along the river bottom, is the subject of many such fantastic horror tales, including other hangings of "unidentified" people, screams from the woods in the night, and devil worship.
 Centerville Hanging Tree: Formerly located in front of the courthouse in Centerville, Texas. Used to hang two outlaws shortly after the end of the American Civil War and later in 1915 to hang a black man accused of murdering Centerville resident Jim Sinclair.
 Coldspring Hanging Tree: Oak tree in Coldspring, Texas, near the historic San Jacinto County jail building.
 Columbus Hanging Tree: Live oak located just outside Columbus, Texas. Long after Texas enacted laws banning the act, two African-American teenagers named Bennie Mitchell, Jr. and Ernest Collins were lynched from this tree in 1935, after being forcibly taken from the Sheriff's protective custody by a masked mob who surrounded his car as he transported the young men to court. The teens had confessed to raping and murdering a local 19-year old high school valedictorian named Geraldine Kollman, but were too young to face any severe penalty under the law. The two teens had also implicated a third older man, who had earlier been questioned and released, but he could not be found again. The tree still stands on the outskirts of Columbus, Texas, not far from where Miss Kollman had been murdered near her family's home.
 Goliad Hanging Tree: Large oak tree in Goliad, Texas. For 24 years the Goliad County court was held under this tree. Many hangings were performed here, including several during the 1857 Cart War between American and Mexican settlers.
 Hallettsville Hanging Tree: Live oak tree located in the Hallettsville, Texas, city park. Used for the September 12, 1879, execution of a Native American man known as "Pocket," who was found guilty of murdering an Englishman named Leonard Hyde in 1878.  After breaking into the family home of a former slave named Frank Edwards, Pocket. who was drunk, threatened to kill Edwards after Edwards had "knocked him down."  Pocket then rode his horse on an attempt to procure weapons, a pistol and shotgun, the latter from a farmer whom Hyde happened to be assisting.  Pocket claimed he needed the shotgun for hunting a flock of wild turkeys he had just spotted, but when Hyde attempted to accompany Pocket on the alleged hunt, Pocket killed him with the pistol.
 Kyle Hanging Tree: Oak tree in Kyle, Texas. According to local lore, in the 1840s a group of cowboys stumbled across this tree and found a dead man hanging from it. The cowboys cut the man down and buried him at the base of the tree. Later the Kyle Cemetery formed up around the tree.
 Orange Hanging Tree: Pin oak tree once located on Main Street in Orange, Texas. In use between the 1840s and 1880s. Cut down in 1892.
 Page's Tree: Used in the 1837 execution of a murderer named Page and two others. Located in the Clarksville, Texas, pioneer cemetery.
 The Old Hanging Oak: 400-year-old live oak tree in Houston, Texas. Said to have been used to hang eleven individuals between 1836 and 1845, and this or an unknown tree close to nearby Founder's Cemetery, several murderers after the Civil War.  Now preserved by the City of Houston Civic Center Department.

Gallery

See also
 Dule tree
 Jail tree
 Moonah Creek Hanging Tree
 List of individual trees

References

Hanging
Capital punishment in the United States
Vigilantism in the United States
Lynching in the United States
Law enforcement in the United States
American frontier
Individual trees in the United States
Hanging